Couthuin Airport  was a public use airport located near Héron, Liège, Belgium.

See also
List of airports in Belgium

References 

Defunct airports in Belgium
Héron